In mathematics, a Newtonian series, named after Isaac Newton, is a sum over a sequence  written in the form

where 

Newtonian series often appear in relations of the form seen in umbral calculus.

List

The generalized binomial theorem gives

A proof for this identity can be obtained by showing that it satisfies the differential equation

 

The digamma function: 

The Stirling numbers of the second kind are given by the finite sum

This formula is a special case of the kth forward difference of the monomial xn evaluated at x = 0:

A related identity forms the basis of the Nörlund–Rice integral:

The trigonometric functions have umbral identities:

and 

The umbral nature of these identities is a bit more clear by writing them in terms of the falling factorial . The first few terms of the sin series are

which can be recognized as resembling the Taylor series for sin x, with (s)n standing in the place of xn.

In analytic number theory it is of interest to sum

where B are the Bernoulli numbers. Employing the generating function its Borel sum can be evaluated as 

The general relation gives the Newton series

where  is the Hurwitz zeta function and  the Bernoulli polynomial. The series does not converge, the identity holds formally.

Another identity is 

This follows from the general form of a Newton series for equidistant nodes (when it exists, i.e. is convergent)

See also
 Binomial transform
 List of factorial and binomial topics
 Nörlund–Rice integral
 Carlson's theorem

References
 Philippe Flajolet and Robert Sedgewick, "Mellin transforms and asymptotics: Finite differences and Rice's integrals",  Theoretical Computer Science 144 (1995) pp 101–124.

Finite differences
Factorial and binomial topics
Newton series